Mummery is a surname.

List of people with the surname 

 Albert F. Mummery (1855–1895), British mountaineer
 Browning Mummery (1888–1974), Australian operatic tenor
 Browning Mummery (Electronic sound works), stage name of Andrew Lonsdale (born 1961), Australian electronic musician
 Christine L. Mummery (1953), British developmental biologist
 Eddie Mummery, English football player
 John Howard Mummery, a British biologist and source of the eponymous Pink tooth of Mummery
 John Mummery, English appeal court justice
 June Mummery, British businesswoman and politician

See also
Mummery (disambiguation)

English-language surnames
Surnames of English origin
Surnames of British Isles origin